Swimming at the 11th Pan American Games was held August 12–18, 1991 in Havana, Cuba. The competition consisted of 32 events (26 individual and 6 relay); and were contested in the long course (50m) pool.

Brazil's victory in the men's 4x100m freestyle relay was only the second time that the U.S. lost the gold in a relay event, at the Pan American Games. The first had been to Canada in women's 4x100m medley at the 1971 Pan American Games.

It was the first time that the U.S. lost the gold medal in the men's 100 meter freestyle, after 10 straight titles. This feat fitted Gustavo Borges, who went on to win four Olympic medals after this.

Results

Men's events

Women's events

Medal table

References

Results
Folha Online
ISHOF

 
Events at the 1991 Pan American Games
Swimming at the Pan American Games
Pan American Games